The Innocent is a Spanish television mystery thriller miniseries directed by Oriol Paulo and based on the Harlan Coben novel of the same name. The show stars Mario Casas, Alexandra Jiménez, Aura Garrido and José Coronado. It was released on Netflix on 30 April 2021.

Premise 
9 years after getting himself involved in a quarrel and accidentally killing a man, Mateo (Mario Casas) attempts to start over with his wife Olivia (Aura Garrido). They will, however, be surprised by new developments that will tear their lives apart again.

Cast

Background, production and release 
The Innocent is one of 14 Harlan Coben novels to be made into Netflix series, following Coben's signing of a deal with the company in August 2018. It was announced by Netflix in November 2019, and production began in September 2020. Consisting of 8 episodes, the series is produced by Sospecha Films and Think Studio. Oriol Paulo, Jordi Vallejo and Guillem Clua wrote the screenplay. Oriol Paulo, Sandra Hermida, Jesús de la Vega, Eneko Lizarraga, Belén Atienza, Laura Rubirola and Harlan Coben are credited as executive producers. Largely set in Barcelona, the series was shot in different locations across Catalonia. The secondary setting in Marbella was recreated in the Maresme (Sant Pol de Mar) and Lloret de Mar. The trailer was released on 5 March 2021, and the premiere date of 30 April 2021 announced.

Episodes

References

External links
 
 
 

2020s Spanish drama television series
2021 Spanish television series debuts
2021 Spanish television series endings
Spanish-language Netflix original programming
Spanish thriller television series
Television series based on American novels
Television shows filmed in Spain
Television shows set in Barcelona
Television shows set in Andalusia